Division No. 2 is one of eighteen census divisions in the province of Saskatchewan, Canada, as defined by Statistics Canada. It is located in the south-southeastern part of the province, on the United States border. The most populous community in this division is Weyburn.

Demographics 

Census subdivisions 
The following census subdivisions (municipalities or municipal equivalents) are located within Saskatchewan's Division No. 2.

Cities
Weyburn

Towns
Bengough
Midale
Milestone
Ogema
Radville
Yellow Grass

Villages

Avonlea
Ceylon
Creelman
Fillmore
Goodwater
Halbrite
Lang
Macoun
McTaggart
Minton
Osage
Pangman
Torquay

Rural municipalities

 RM No. 6 Cambria
 RM No. 7 Souris Valley
 RM No. 8 Lake Alma
 RM No. 9 Surprise Valley
 RM No. 10 Happy Valley
 RM No. 36 Cymri
 RM No. 37 Lomond
 RM No. 38 Laurier
 RM No. 39 The Gap
 RM No. 40 Bengough
 RM No. 66 Griffin
 RM No. 67 Weyburn
 RM No. 68 Brokenshell
 RM No. 69 Norton
 RM No. 70 Key West
 RM No. 96 Fillmore
 RM No. 97 Wellington
 RM No. 98 Scott
 RM No. 99 Caledonia
 RM No. 100 Elmsthorpe

Indian reserves
 Piapot Cree Nation
 Piapot Cree First Nation 75H

See also 
List of census divisions of Saskatchewan
List of communities in Saskatchewan
SARM Division No. 2

References

Division. No. 2, Saskatchewan Statistics Canada

 
02